Mya may refer to:

Brands and product names 
 Mya (program), an intelligent personal assistant created by Motorola
 Mya (TV channel), an Italian Television channel
 Midwest Young Artists, a comprehensive youth music program

Codes 
 Burmese language, ISO 639-3 code is 
 Moruya Airport's IATA code
 The IOC, license plate, and UNDP country code for Myanmar ("MYA")

People 
 Mya (given name)
 Mya (singer) (Mya Marie Harrison, born 1979), an American R&B singer-songwriter and actress
 Bo Mya (1927–2006), nom de guerre of a Myanmar rebel leader, chief commander of the Karen National Union

Other uses 
 Mýa (album), a 1998 album by Mýa
 Mya (bivalve), a genus of soft-shell clams
 MYA (unit) for "million years ago", a science-related unit of time used in astronomy, geology and biology

See also

 A (motor yacht) (M/Y A), a superyacht
 Maia (disambiguation)
 Maya (disambiguation)
 Myia (fl. 500 BC), Pythagorean philosopher